Nicon Airways was a short-lived airline based in Nigeria between 2006 and 2007.

History

In July 2006, Fleet Air Nigeria Limited, a subsidiary of NICON Group, merged with EAS Airlines, thus creating Nicon Airways. Until its closure one year later, the newly formed airline operated domestic services among Lagos, Abuja and Jos.

Fleet
The Nicon Airways fleet consisted of the following aircraft:
2 Boeing 737-200.

References

Defunct airlines of Nigeria
Airlines established in 2006
Airlines disestablished in 2007